The Sudbury Theatre Centre is a professional theatre company, located in Greater Sudbury, Ontario, Canada.

Following an Ontario government report in 1967 which recommended the creation of a theatre company in Sudbury, local arts patrons Sonja Dunn, Carolyn Fouriezos, Bill Hart, Bob Remnant and Peg Roberts raised funds to bring the Gryphon Theatre Company of Barrie to Sudbury for a production of Neil Simon's Come Blow Your Horn. That production was staged at Laurentian University's Fraser Auditorium in May 1970.

Following that production, the Sudbury Theatre Centre was officially incorporated on September 14, 1971. Over the next number of years, the STC staged plays and children's theatre workshops at Fraser Auditorium, Cambrian College and the Inco Club.  Its success was largely due to the dedication of long-standing artistic director Tony Lloyd, who made it his mission to build a theatre for the people of Sudbury.

In 1980, the city of Sudbury donated a parcel of municipal land on Shaughnessy Street near Civic Square to the STC for the construction of their own permanent 289-seat theatre. Construction began in July 1981, and the new facility was officially opened at the launch of the company's 1982 theatre season.

In 2015, the theatre underwent a modernization that included renovations to the lobby and an updated and improved lounge area. At the same time, the expanded their liquor license into the auditorium and improved ticketing for expedited entry.

As of 2017, STC has expanded their programming to include a performing arts series that includes music, dance, comedy, and spectacle. These offerings complement their existing main-stage theatre series. The theatre also stages an annual youth drama program to educate students in the performing arts. In 2020, the theatre's artistic director John McHenry debuted on CKLU-FM, the campus radio station of the city's Laurentian University, as cohost of Arts at Nine, a weekly radio show about the city's arts community.

Local and out of town groups often make use of the space for various productions including other plays, musical shows, and private events.

The Sudbury Theatre Centre plays an important role in the community. With all of the cutbacks to arts programs in schools, the STC helps to fill the void. 

When I went to the Sudbury Theatre Centre for a school field trip, I was excited to see my very first play. It was cool seeing the stage, the backdrops moving and feeling the excitement in the air. It was fun seeing my first play. 

The theatre also provides an opportunity for youth to explore theatre in a more in depth way than might be taught in schools. With seasoned actors as instructors, STC offers acting programs for youth in the area. Vocal techniques for singing and projecting their voices is also taught. Students can also be exposed to the many behind the scenes aspects of the theatre environment. 

All of these skills and knowledge youth get from the theatre can help in their future if they become an actor or if they become something else. If they become a CEO or a teacher, the practice of projecting their voice and speaking in front of an audience can help for meetings or talking to a class. 

It also helps with being a carpenter having that experience from making sets and more. As you can see working a little in a theatre can give a person experience that can help with many future indeverse. 

So without the Sudbury Theatre Centre we will miss out on a lot of these opportunities. I think that we should keep the theatre and I hope you agree.

References

External links
 Sudbury Theatre Centre

Theatres in Ontario
Theatre companies in Ontario
Culture of Greater Sudbury
1971 establishments in Ontario
Tourist attractions in Greater Sudbury